The LeGrand Sports Complex is now LeGrand Stadium at 1st Community Credit Union Field at Angelo State University in San Angelo, Texas.

Originally Angelo State University'strack and field complex, the facility was updated in 2013 to become a football stadium, as well. In 2014, LeGrand Stadium at 1st Community Credit Union Field was introduced as the new home of the Rams football team in addition to the Rams and Rambelles track and field programs.

On October 1, 2008 the Texas Tech University System regents voted to rename the Multi-Sports Complex to the LeGrand Sports Complex in recognition of Dr. Robert and Jean Ann LeGrand's support of Angelo State University. Dr. Robert LeGrand, a San Angelo Neurosurgeon, and Jean Ann LeGrand an ASU graduate have donated over $2.7 million to Angelo State University including a $200K donation to update the Sports Complex in preparation for the 2011 NCAA Division II National Track and Field Championships.

The LeGrands donated $1.4 million in 2013 to add bleachers to the east side and new stadium lights with construction that was completed prior to the start of the 2014 football season. In addition to the gift by the LeGrands, Texas Bank donated $50,000 towards a scoreboard in the north end zone.

A new $1.2 million field turf project, which was made possible by a generous contribution by 1st Community Federal Credit Union and private support from Larry C. Clark, the San Angelo Health Foundation and an anonymous donor was completed in the fall of 2013. Hellas Construction, Inc. installed a new Matrix® Turf field and epiQ TRACKS™ track system. The pole vault and long/triple jump runways were moved to the outside of the track. A new shot put ring and high jump apron were also installed and the javelin runway was moved to the upper practice field. The field is named 1st Community Credit Union Field. 

Funded by a gift from Richard and B.J. Mayer, the Mayer Press Box was added to the facility in 2018. The 7,300-square-foot facility houses restrooms and concession stands on the first floor, media and VIP suites on the second floor, coaches’ and VIP suites on the third floor, and a video deck on the roof.

The facility has been the host of numerous track and field events, including the NCAA Division II National Championships in 1988, 1991, 1992, 2002 and 2009. The facility was also the site of the 2005 and 2011 Lone Star Conference Championship meet.

The facility features a 400-meter all-weather track, throwing areas, full press box facilities and seating for 5,670 people. In 1994, additional throwing areas were added across Jackson Street from the facility to provide a safer environment for competition in both the hammer and 35-pound weight. The Junell Center is located at the top of the left curve of the track, with weight-lifting areas overlooking the track.

The facility is also lighted for evening and night competition. A fully automatic Finish Lynx timing system and scoreboard are also at the site, in addition to complete locker room and training facilities.

References

External links
Angelo State sports

Angelo State Rams
Athletics (track and field) venues in Texas
College track and field venues in the United States 
Sports venues in San Angelo, Texas